An unsinkable aircraft carrier is a term sometimes used to refer to a geographically or politically important island that is used to extend the power projection of a military force. Because such an entity is capable of acting as an airbase and is a physical landmass not easily destroyed, it is, in effect, an immobile aircraft carrier that cannot be sunk.

The term unsinkable aircraft carrier first appeared during World War II, to describe the islands and atolls in the Pacific Ocean that became strategically important as potential airstrips for American bombers in their transoceanic war against Japan. To this end, the US military engaged in numerous island hopping operations to oust the occupying Japanese forces from such islands; the US Navy Seabees would often have to subsequently construct airstrips there from scratch—sometimes over entire atolls—quickly, in order to support air operations against Japan.

Midway Atoll has been described as a fourth, unsinkable, American aircraft carrier at the Battle of Midway in 1942 (the Americans had three normal carriers). It did indeed function this way in the battle, with aircraft from the atoll attacking Japanese carriers and the atoll being attacked in turn.

Malta and Iceland were sometimes described as unsinkable aircraft carriers during World War II, making Malta a target of the Axis powers. At the end of the Chinese Civil War, the US military was said to have considered Taiwan an unsinkable aircraft carrier, though this position toward Taiwan changed when the United States and the People's Republic of China normalized relations in the 1970s and the United States annulled the Sino-American Mutual Defense Treaty with Taiwan. However, the United States has de facto maintained the status quo through the Taiwan Relations Act. The US military is also said to have considered the British Isles as unsinkable aircraft carriers during the Cold War. In 1983, Japanese Prime Minister Yasuhiro Nakasone pledged to make Japan an "unsinkable aircraft carrier in the Pacific", assisting the US in defending against the threat of Soviet bombers. US Secretary of State General Alexander Haig described Israel as "the largest American aircraft carrier in the world that cannot be sunk". In arguing against production of the CVA-01 aircraft carriers, the Royal Air Force claimed that Australia could serve adequately in the same role, using false maps that placed Singapore  closer to Australia.
The island of Cyprus is also often described as an unsinkable aircraft carrier, in relation to the military presence of the United Kingdom there.

During the Second World War, the United Kingdom gave some serious thought to building virtually unsinkable aircraft carriers from ice reinforced with sawdust (Project Habakkuk). A model was made, and serious consideration was given to the project, with a design displacing 2.2 million tons and accommodating 150 twin-engined bombers on the drawing board, but it was never produced.

See also
Diego Garcia
Military on Gotland
Mobile offshore base
Strategic geography
Tinian in World War II
Territorial disputes in the South China Sea

References

Further reading 

Military strategy
Political science terminology
International security
Military airbases
Military logistics
Islands